The 2013–14 Iraq Division One The season began on December 8, 2013.

Format and teams

League consists of 55 clubs in 7 groups, where will qualify first and second of each group to the stage for a second to become the number of teams 14 team is added to them two teams in addition to the teams that landed last season, namely, and bringing the total number of 20 teams are divided into 4 sets each with five teams the first to qualify and the second of the two groups 1, 2, 3 clubs of 3 and 4 to the final stage, which will consist of two groups each group where five clubs first climb and the second from each group to the 2014–15 Iraqi Premier League next season.

Number of teams by Iraqi Governorates

Final stage
The final stage will be two groups, each team plays one game in a group with other teams. The top two teams from each group to the 2014–15 Iraqi Premier League next season.

Group 1

Group 2

Others
 2013–14 Iraqi Premier League

References

External links
 Iraq Football Association

Iraq Division One seasons
Division One